"Stamp Out Loneliness" is a song written by C. Belew and V. Givens, performed by Stonewall Jackson, and released on the Columbia label (catalog no. 4–43966). It debuted on the Billboard country and western chart in February 1967, peaked at the No. 5 spot, and remained on the chart for a total of 14 weeks.

References

Stonewall Jackson (musician) songs
1967 songs
Song recordings produced by Don Law
Songs written by Carl Belew